Azis is a Bulgarian-Romani musician.

Azis, a variant of the name Aziz, may also refer to:

People

Given name
 Azis Tahir Ajdonati, Albanian politician
 Azis Efendi Gjirokastra, Albanian politician
 Azis Jamman (born 1974), Malaysian politician
 Azis Syamsuddin (born 1970), Indonesian politician
 Abdul Azis Saleh, Indonesian anthropologist

Surname
 Eszrafiq Azis (born 1986) Malaysian cricketer
 Harry Azhar Azis (born 1956) Indonesian politician
 Idham Azis (born 1963) Indonesian police general

See also

 
 
 Aziz (disambiguation)
 Azi (disambiguation)